George Stewart (born 29 August 1947 in Edinburgh) is a Scottish former professional footballer, who played for Dundee and Hibernian. Born in Edinburgh, Stewart started his career with Tynecastle Boys Club, before signing for Dundee in 1964. Stewart was part of the Dundee side that won the 1973 Scottish League Cup Final.

He transferred to Hibernian in 1976, after Dundee were relegated from the Scottish Premier Division. Stewart played in over 100 league matches for Hibs, and played in the twice-replayed 1979 Scottish Cup Final. Stewart had helped Hibs reach that final by scoring one of the goals against Edinburgh derby rivals Hearts in the quarter-final. Stewart left Hibs in 1981 to sign for Cowdenbeath, but at the end of the season he joined Dunfermline as a coach. He then returned to Hibs as an assistant to Pat Stanton.

References

External links 

1947 births
Cowdenbeath F.C. players
Dundee F.C. players
Dunfermline Athletic F.C. non-playing staff
Hibernian F.C. non-playing staff
Hibernian F.C. players
Living people
Footballers from Edinburgh
Scottish footballers
Scottish Football League players
Association football central defenders